Stealth may refer to:

Military
Stealth technology, technology used to conceal ships, aircraft, and missiles
Stealth aircraft, aircraft which use stealth technology
Stealth ground vehicle, ground vehicles which use stealth technology
Stealth patrol unit, used by police forces in the United States and Canada
Stealth ship, ships which use stealth technology

Media

Books
Stealth magazine, an independent hip-hop magazine from Australia

Film and Television
Stealth (film), a 2005 action/adventure thriller
The Stealth, a 2008 3D-animated short film
"Stealth (The Americans)", episode of The Americans

Music
Stealth (album), a 2007 release by the band Scorn
Stealth Records, an independent record label specializing in electronic dance music
"Stealth", a song by Way Out West from Intensify
Stealth, a model of B.C. Rich guitar

Video games
Stealth game, a genre of video games
Stealth (1984 video game), a rail shooter game published by Broderbund
Stealth (1992 video game), a Japan-exclusive game released for the Super Famicom

Sports
Houston Stealth, a team in the National Women's Basketball League, active 2002–2004
Wichita Stealth, an arena football team, active 1999–2004
San Jose Stealth, a team in the National Lacrosse League, active 2004–2009
Washington Stealth, a team in the National Lacrosse League, active 2009–2013
Vancouver Stealth, a team in the National Lacrosse League, founded 2013

Technology
Stealth virus, elusive technologies for computer viruses
Mitsubishi GTO also known as the Dodge Stealth, a sports car
Nighthawk (roller coaster), an America roller coaster formerly known as STEALTH
Stealth (roller coaster), at Thorpe Park in the United Kingdom
Airrow A-8S Stealth, a pneumatic air rifle

Other uses
Crypsis, the ability of an animal or plant to avoid observation or detection by other animals
Stealth mode, secretive business behavior
Stealth tax, a new tax that is collected in a way that is not obvious
Stealth (transgender), passing unseen as one's desired gender in the public sphere
Stealth Communications, an Internet Service Provider in New York City
Leo Stoller (born 1946), who claims "Stealth" as a trademark

See also
 Camouflage
 Concealment device
 Confidentiality
 Covert operation
 Ninjutsu
 Secrecy
 Subterfuge (disambiguation)